Leabhar Oiris is a Gaelic-Irish manuscript and chronicle.

An Leabhar Oiris was created by one, or more, author or authors, who drew on material in the Irish annals relating to the years 976 to 1028. It is believed to have been written in an Irish monastic scriptorium, after 976 and by 1500.

References
Manuscript sources
 Royal Irish Academy, MS 756 pp. 194–207
 Royal Irish Academy, MS 485, pp. 240–75
 Trinity College Library, MS 1287, pp. 59–85
 Dublin, Trinity College Library, MS 1280, folio 64
 Dublin, Trinity College Library, MS 1296, pp. 214–32
 British Library, Egerton 105, folio 296
 Royal Irish Academy, MS 689, p. 93
 Royal Irish Academy, MS 258
 Royal Irish Academy, MS 973, section 3, p. 50
 Trinity College Library, MS 1289
 Trinity College Library, MS 1329, p. 153

Editions
 R. I. Best, "The Leabhar Oiris", Ériu; vol. 1 (1904): 74–112 (includes apparatus &c.)
 Eoin MacNeill, "Cath Cluan Tairbh", Gaelic Journal; 7 (1896): 8–11, 41–44, 55–57; and 
 Cian Mac Maolmhuaidh, Gaelic Journal; 7 (1896): 67–71.

Other
 Henri d'Arbois de Jubainville, Essai d'un catalogue de la littérature épique d'Irlande Paris, 1883; p. 60
 Colm Ó Lochlainn, "Poets on the battle of Clontarf", Éigse; 3 (1941–42): 208–18, 4 (1943–44) 33–47.

External links
 G100029; University College Cork

Irish manuscripts
Irish-language literature
Documents
Irish chronicles
Texts of medieval Ireland